Baron Masayuki Matsuda (November 2, 1892 – May 2, 1976) was Governor of the South Seas Mandate (1932-1933). He was a graduate of Kyoto University. He was a relative of Yoriyasu Arima.

1892 births
1976 deaths
Governors of the South Seas Mandate
Members of the Government-General of Korea
Kyoto University alumni
People from Tokyo